The frejgatina (plural frejgatini) is a traditional fishing boat from Malta, its name meaning "little frigate." It is a small, carvel-built rowing boat. It is generally only used to move from the shore to a larger boat anchored offshore.

It is transom-sterned, open, and steered with two oars, although some modern boats have engines attached, to move the boat and/or operate the winch.  Some modern frejgatini are made with fibreglass instead of wood.

Since 1935 frejgatini have raced in the annual Victory Day regatta.

References

Boat types
Types of fishing vessels
Maltese culture
Maritime history of Malta
Rowing racing boats